A prominence, sometimes referred to as a filament, is a large plasma and magnetic field structure extending outward from the Sun's surface, often in a loop shape. Prominences are anchored to the Sun's surface in the photosphere, and extend outwards into the solar corona.  While the corona consists of extremely hot plasma, prominences contain much cooler plasma, similar in composition to that of the chromosphere.

Prominences form over timescales of about a day and may persist in the corona for several weeks or months, looping hundreds of thousands of kilometers into space. Some prominences may give rise to coronal mass ejections. Scientists are currently researching how and why prominences are formed.

History

The first detailed description of a solar prominence was in 14th-century Laurentian Codex, describing the Solar eclipse of 1 May 1185. They were described as "flame-like tongues of live embers."

Prominences were first photographed during the solar eclipse of July 18, 1860 by Angelo Secchi. From these photographs, altitude, emissivity, and many other important parameters were able to be derived for the first time.

During the solar eclipse of August 18, 1868, spectroscopes were for the first time able to detect the presence of emission lines from prominences. The detection of a hydrogen line confirmed that prominences were gaseous in nature. Pierre Janssen was also able to detect an emission line corresponding to an at the time unknown element now known as helium. The following day, Janssen confirmed his measurements by recording the emission lines from the now unobstructed Sun, a task that had never been done before. Using his new techniques, astronomers were able to study prominences daily.

Classification

There are a number of different prominence classification schemes in use today. One of the most widely used and basic schemes classifies prominences based on the magnetic environment in which they had formed. There are three classes:
 Active region prominences, or active region filaments, form within the relatively strong magnetic fields at the centers of active regions. Active region prominences have lifetimes ranging from hours to days and erupt more often than prominences belonging to the other classes. As a consequence of being located within active regions, active region prominences are usually found in low  latitudes.
 Intermediate prominences, or intermediate filaments, form between a weak unipolar plage regions and active regions.
 Quiescent prominences, or quiescent filaments, form in the weak background magnetic field far from any active regions. Unlike active region prominences, quiescent prominences are relatively stable and can have lifetimes ranging from weeks to months, hence the name . Quiescent prominences are typically located at high latitudes around what is referred to as the polar crown. Additionally, quiescent prominences generally reach much greater heights in the corona than active region prominences.

Active region and quiescent prominences can also be differentiated by their emitted spectra. The spectra of active region prominences is identical to that of the upper chromosphere having strong He II lines but very weak ionized metal lines.

Morphology

Filament channels
Prominences form in magnetic structures known as filament channels where they are thermally shielded from the surrounding corona and supported against gravity. These channels are found in the chromosphere and lower corona above divisions between regions of opposite photospheric magnetic polarity known as polarity inversion lines (PIL). The presence of a filament channel is a necessary condition for the formation of a prominence, but a filament channel can exist without containing a prominence. Multiple prominences may form and erupt from within one filament channel over the channel's lifetime. The magnetic field making up the filament channel is predominantly horizontal, pointing in the same direction on both sides of the PIL (see ).

Prominence material does not occupy the entire width of the filament channel; a tunnel-like region less dense than the corona, known as a coronal cavity, occupies the volume between the prominence and the overlying magnetic arcade.

Spines and barbs
Typical prominences have a narrow structure oriented along the filament channel known as a spine. The spine defines the upper main body of a prominence and is generally in the form of a vertical sheet that diverges towards the photosphere at both ends. Many prominences also have smaller structures referred to as barbs that similarly diverge from the spine towards the chromosphere and photosphere. Spines and barbs are both composed of thin threads that trace the magnetic field similar to chromospheric fibrils.

The cool prominence material that makes up spines and barbs—the prominence core—is surrounded by a prominence-corona transition region (PCTR) where there is a steep temperature gradient. The PCTR is responsible for most of the optical emission of prominences.

Overlying structures

Above filament channels lie overarching magnetic s which can extend from  into the corona. Above these arcades, the closed coronal magnetic field may extend radially outward forming what is known as a helmet streamer. These streamers may reach a solar radius or more above the Sun's surface.

Chirality
Filament channels and their prominence, if present, exhibit chirality. When observed from the side of the filament channel with positive magnetic polarity, the channel is said to be dextral if the horizontal magnetic field is oriented rightward and sinistral if it is oriented leftward. Dextral channels have been found more frequently in the Sun's northern hemisphere and sinistral channels more frequently in the southern hemisphere.

The horizontally oriented magnetic field causes chromospheric fibrils along the filament channel to lie nearly parallel to the PIL and anti-parallel to one another on opposite sides of the PIL. The directions that these fibrils are oriented depend on the chirality of the channel. On the side of the PIL with positive magnetic polarity, dextral channels have fibrils which stream to the right and barbs which bear to the right, whereas sinistral channels have fibrils which stream to the left and barbs which bear to the left. Additionally, the overlying magnetic arcades of dextral channels are left-skewed, and those of sinistral channels are right-skewed.

Formation
The exact mechanism which leads to the formation of solar prominences is not currently known. Models must be able to explain the formation of the filament channel and its hemisphere-dependent chirality, as well as the origin of the dense plasma that makes up the prominence core.

Eruption

Some prominences are ejected from the Sun in what is known as a prominence eruption. These eruptions can have speeds ranging from 600 km/s to more than 1000 km/s. At least 70% of prominence eruptions are associated with an ejection of coronal material into the solar wind known as a coronal mass ejection.

See also
 Active region
 Hyder flare
 Solar flare

Explanatory notes

References

Further reading

External links 
 

Articles containing video clips
Solar phenomena